Arthur Oliver may refer to:

 Arthur Olliver (1916–1988), Australian rules footballer
 Arthur Robert Oliver, New Zealand politician

See also
Arthur Ollivier (1851–1897), New Zealand businessman